Rick Palacio (born November 3, 1974) is an American political executive who served as Chairman of the Colorado Democratic Party from 2011 to 2017.

Early life and education 
He was born in Pueblo, Colorado. Palacio graduated from Regis University in Denver.

Career 
Prior to his service as Chair, Palacio worked in a variety of roles in Colorado and national politics. Palacio held multiple roles with then-U.S. Rep. John Salazar, including Legislative Assistant and later Deputy Communications Director.

In 2008, he was hired as Deputy Director of Member Service in the office of the House Majority Leader Steny Hoyer. Palacio was one of the primary Congressional staffers responsible for the repeal of Don't ask, don't tell.

Palacio was elected Chairman of the Colorado Democratic Party on March 5, 2011. He is the first Latino in Colorado's history to hold the office of chair of a major political party, and when elected was second in the nation. Palacio served as a Senior Advisor for the John Hickenlooper 2020 presidential campaign.

Palacio is the founder of PSGroup, a political and corporate consulting firm based in Denver, Colorado. In April 2020, Palacio joined Brownstein Hyatt Farber Schreck, a law and lobbying firm, in their State & Local Legislation & Policy Group.

Awards and recognition
2008: 5280 Magazine's list of Colorado's Most Influential Latinos
2011: Advocate Magazine's List of 40 Under Forty
2011: Out Front Colorado's "Power" list of most Influential GLBT Coloradans
2011: Southern Colorado Equality Alliance "Pride of Pueblo" award 
2015: 40 Under 40: Latinos in American Politics

References

External links

1974 births
Colorado Democratic Party chairs
LGBT Hispanic and Latino American people
LGBT people from Colorado
Living people
People from Pueblo, Colorado